The 1923 Haskell Indians football team was an American football team that represented the Haskell Institute (later renamed Haskell Indian Nations University) as an independent during the 1923 college football season.  In its second season under head coach Dick Hanley, the team compiled an 11–2–1 record, shut out eight opponents, and outscored all opponents by a total of 496 to 62.

For the second consecutive season, fullback John Levi, also known as "Skee", was the team captain. He was also selected by Football World and Athletic World magazines as the first-team fullback on the 1923 All-America team.  Haskell players finished first and second in the US in scoring: John Levi with 149 points and end Ansel Carpenter, aka "White Weasel", with 104 points.  Carpenter caught a record-breaking 55-yard pass from Levi in 1923 and developed a reputation as "one of the surest kickers in the game."

Other notable players on Haskell's 1923 team included George Levi and Elkins at halfback, Scott at quarterback, King at center, Jack Norton, aka "Charging Skunk", and Kilbuck at guard, and Peratrovich, Nix, and Theodore "Tiny" Roebuck at tackle. John Levi were inaugural inductees in 1971 into the American Indian Athletic Hall of Fame.

Schedule

References

Haskell
Haskell Indian Nations Fighting Indians football seasons
Haskell Indians football